Tekarihogen or Dekarihokenh (Tekarihó:ken) is the title and office of an Iroquois League sachem of the Mohawk nation. The title has been rendered in English in numerous spelling variations.

The title of Dekarihokenh is hereditary through the maternal line; each office holder is a male of the Mohawk Turtle clan. He is appointed by the senior women of the clan, as the Iroquois have a matrilineal system of descent and property. Like the other sachems of the Grand Council of the Six Nations, the Dekarihokenh is part of the ceremonial leadership of the Iroquois, but not necessarily of the political leadership.

Holders of this title included:
 Hendrick Theyanoguin
 John Brant

References

Snow, Dean R. The Iroquois. Cambridge, Massachusetts: Blackwell, 1994.
Sivertsen, Barbara J. Turtles, Wolves, and Bears: A Mohawk Family History. Bowie, Maryland: Heritage Books, 1996.

External links
 
 

Mohawk culture
Titles and offices of Native American leaders
Indigenous politics in Canada